The 2si 215 is a family of single-cylinder, fan-cooled, two-stroke, single ignition, aircraft engines that were designed for ultralight aircraft.

The basic engine was originally designed and produced by JLO-Motorenwerke of Germany and was later acquired by the AMW Cuyuna Engine Company of Beaufort, South Carolina and marketed under the Cuyuna brand name. Later the engine was marketed by Cuyuna under the Two Stroke International (2si) brand. Cuyuna no longer markets engines for aircraft use although the 215 is still in production as an industrial and multi-fuel engine.

Development
The 215 is a conventional single-cylinder engine that weighs  in its 215R aircraft version. The engine features single breaker and points ignition, with single capacitor discharge ignition used on the current models. It also incorporates piston porting, tuned exhaust system, single carburetor, fan cooling, fuel pump, a cast iron cylinder liner, ball, needle and roller bearings throughout. The 215R aircraft version was offered with an optional belt reduction system and the modern industrial versions have an optional gearbox with ratios of 2.04, 2.65 and 3.06. Starting is a recoil starter with a custom electric starter available as an option.

Variants
215D
Gasoline aircraft engine with direct drive. Single carburetor,  at 6000 rpm, weight , out of production.
215F
Gasoline industrial engine. Single carburetor,  at 6000 rpm, still in production.
215MF
Multi-fuel industrial engine. Single carburetor,  at 6500 rpm, weight , still in production.
215R
Gasoline aircraft engine with belt reduction drive. single carburetor,  at 6000 rpm, weight , out of production.

Applications

Specifications (215D aircraft engine)

See also

References

Air-cooled aircraft piston engines
Two-stroke aircraft piston engines